"Honaloochie Boogie" is a single released by Mott the Hoople. It was the follow-up to their breakthrough single "All The Young Dudes". It reached a peak position in the UK Singles Chart of number 12 in July 1973. Written and sung by vocalist Ian Hunter, apart from the group's regular line-up, it also featured  Andy Mackay of Roxy Music on tenor saxophone, Bill Price on moog, and Paul Buckmaster on cello.

A cover version was released as a promo single in France by Babylon Zoo in 1999 and was included on their album King Kong Groover.

References

Mott the Hoople songs
1973 singles
Songs written by Ian Hunter (singer)
1973 songs